Carlos Damas (born 1973) is a leading Portuguese classical violinist and recording artist for Dux Records, Brilliant Classics, Et'cetera Records and Naxos. He is particularly known for his Fritz Kreisler interpretations and world premiere recordings of works by the Portuguese composers António Fragoso, Luís de Freitas Branco, Fernando Lopes-Graça and Sérgio Azevedo.
Carlos Damas is widely regarded as the most significant Portuguese violinist currently before the public, with a brilliant international career encompassing the great masterpieces to contemporary works, attested by an impressive international discography. He has often been compared by international critics to such masters as Thomas Zehetmair, Gidon Kremer and Henryk Szeryng.

Life and career

Damas was born in Coimbra where he began his musical studies at the Coimbra Conservatory at the age of three. When he was six, his family moved to Lisbon where he continued his violin studies with Vasco Broco, Leonor Prado, and Alexandra Mendes. He made his solo concert debut when he was 15 in a performance with the Portuguese Radio Symphony Orchestra conducted by Joaquim da Silva Pereira. He then pursued further studies at the Paris Conservatory with Jacqueline Lefèvre and Ivry Gitlis. He premiered Luís de Freitas Branco's Concert for Violin in Paris in 1993. Sérgio Azevedo's Reflections on a Portuguese Lullaby for solo violin and string orchestra was written for and dedicated to Damas.

Damas is a regular soloist with Zagreb Philharmonic Orchestra, Prague Philharmonic Orchestra, Camerata de St. Severin, Camerata da Madeira, Winnipeg Symphony,  Guanzhou Symphony Orchestra, St. Luke's Orchestra, Mission Chamber Orchestra of San José. He has also performed in Macao with the Macao Chamber Orchestra several times since 1997 and has appeared as a soloist in concerts organized by the Melody for Dialogue Among Civilizations Association in conjunction with UNESCO, including a performance of the Bach Double Violin Concerto at Lincoln Center in 2007. 

Carlos Damas has performed as soloist in renowned concert halls, including Salle Gaveau and Salle Cortot (Paris), Tearto D. Pedro V (Macau), Unesco Grand Auditorium (Paris), Calouste de Gulbenkian Foundation, S. Luiz Theater and Belém Cultural Center, Lee Hysan Concert Hall in Hong Kong, Ville Louvigy Orchester Philarmonique du Luxembourg, Oriental Arts Center in Shanghai, Lisinski Zagreb concert hall.

Carlos Damas has a PhD in Education and Psychology of Music, and is violin teacher at Évora University. HIs instrument is one Giovanni Battista Gabrielli, the "ex-Isham", dated from c.a. 1767.

Carlos Damas is married to Jian Hong (cellist) and has one daughter called  Eva Damas.

Recordings 
Carlos Damas made the first world recordings of several Portuguese composers music, recorded for the labels Dux, Brilliant Classics, and Naxos:

Paganini, Wieniavsky, Sarasate, etc. - Aprés un Rêve (Etcetera July 2021)
L. V. Beethoven - Complete Violin Sonatas (Etcetera September 2020)
Jean Sibelius - Works for Violin and Piano (Etcetera September 2016)
Frederico de Freitas - Complete Violin Works (Brilliant Classics, 2015)
Armando José Fernandes (Brilliant Classics, 2014)
António Fragoso (Brilliant Classics, 2011)
Luís de Freitas Branco (Naxos, 2010)
Fritz Kreisler (DUX Records 2009)
Carlos Damas - Modern Solo Violin Music, including the first recordings of Lopes-Graça's Espçonsais and Azevedo's Sonatina No. 1 (DUX Records 2007)
Beethoven, Sonatas for violin and piano nº4 & nº5" (MasterClassics/Universal 2004)
Carlos Damas - Violino Solo (Numérica 2000)
Diálogos do Silêncio (Tradisom/Sony 1997)
Felix Mendelssohn Bartholdy (Numérica 1995)

References

External links 
 

Portuguese classical violinists
Male classical violinists
People from Coimbra
1973 births
Living people
21st-century classical violinists
21st-century male musicians